Anum Fayyaz is a Pakistani former television actress and model. She is known for acting in dramas, such as Ahmed Habib Ki Betiyan and Meri Maa.  Her other roles include Ishq Ibadat, and in the television show Parvarish.

Personal life
She married Asad Anwar on 25 November 2016 in Makkah and they have one child.

Anum recently took to social media to announce her retirement from the entertainment industry. She posted a message calling her decision 'difficult.' "I have decided to leave the industry and wants to focus on her family," the post read and thanked her fans for their support.

Filmography

Television serials

Telefilm

Film

See also
 List of Pakistani actresses

References

External links 
 
 
 

1991 births
Living people
21st-century Pakistani actresses
Pakistani television actresses
Pakistani film actresses